Jana Žitňanská (born 17 May 1974) is a Slovak politician. Since 2014 she has been a Member of the European Parliament, where she is a member of the European Conservatives and Reformists (ECR). She is also a journalist.

References

1974 births
Living people
Politicians from Bratislava
New Majority (Slovakia) MEPs
Women MEPs for Slovakia
MEPs for Slovakia 2014–2019
21st-century Slovak women politicians
21st-century Slovak politicians
Members of the National Council (Slovakia) 2010-2012
Members of the National Council (Slovakia) 2012-2016
Members of the National Council (Slovakia) 2020-present
Female members of the National Council (Slovakia)